Hilder Eduardo Torres Guatemala (born 14 April 1995) is a Honduran footballer who currently plays for C.D. Honduras Progreso in the Liga Salva Vida.

Career
Torres began his career with Honduran side Vida, and later moved on loan to United Soccer League Real Monarchs SLC on 8 February 2016.

References

External links
 

1995 births
Living people
Honduran footballers
C.D.S. Vida players
Real Monarchs players
USL Championship players
Honduran expatriate footballers
Expatriate soccer players in the United States
Honduran expatriate sportspeople in the United States
People from La Ceiba
Association football defenders
Footballers at the 2016 Summer Olympics
Olympic footballers of Honduras
2015 CONCACAF U-20 Championship players